Black Market of Love is a 1966 West German crime film directed by Ernst Hofbauer and starring Uta Levka, Astrid Frank and Claus Tinney.

Synopsis
The plot centers around a white slavery ring operating out of the Italian port of Genoa, luring young German woman for worker as dancers.

Cast
 Uta Levka as Uta
 Astrid Frank as Astrid
 Manfred Meurer as Exzellenz
 Karin Field as Rosanna
 Claus Tinney as Harald von Groepen
 Tilly Lauenstein as Countess
 Rolf Eden as Rolf
 Elio Manni as Flip
 Karl Gretler as Charly
 Omero Antonutti as Lemaire
 Christine Dass as Antoinette
 Rico Peter as Landlord
 Karin Glier as Mary
 Jochen Rock
 Li Hardes as Birgit
 Helga Schwartz as Anne

References

Bibliography

External links 
 

1966 films
1966 crime films
German crime films
West German films
1960s German-language films
Films directed by Ernst Hofbauer
Films set in Berlin
Films set in Genoa
Films about prostitution in Germany
1960s German films